Liverpool Plains, an electoral district of the Legislative Assembly in the Australian state of New South Wales, had three incarnations, from 1859 to 1880, from 1904 to 1920 and from 1927 to 1962.


Election results

Elections in the 1960s

1961 by-election

Elections in the 1950s

1959

1956

1953

1950

Elections in the 1940s

1947

1944

1941

Elections in the 1930s

1938

1935

1932

1930

Elections in the 1920s

1927

1920 - 1927

Elections in the 1910s

1917

1913

October 1911 by-election

August 1911 by-election

1910

Elections in the 1900s

1907

1904

1880 - 1904

Elections in the 1870s

1877

1876 by-election

1875

1872

1871 by-election

1870 by-election

Elections in the 1860s

1869

1864

1863 by-election

1860

1860 by-election

Elections in the 1850s

1859

Notes

References

New South Wales state electoral results by district